The teams competing in Group 4 of the 1998 UEFA European Under-21 Championship qualifying competition were Austria, Belarus, Estonia, Latvia, Scotland and Sweden.

Standings

Matches
All times are CET.

Goalscorers
TBD

External links
 Group 4 at UEFA.com

Group 4